Isaïe Songa (born 5 August 1994) is a Rwandan football striker who currently plays for Étincelles.

References 

1994 births
Living people
Rwandan footballers
Rwanda international footballers
Isonga F.C. players
APR F.C. players
Police F.C. (Rwanda) players
Etincelles F.C. players
Association football forwards